Arrest & Trial is an American, syndicated nontraditional court show which follows individual criminal cases (commission, police investigation, and actual trial) via a combination of reenactments and real trial footage. Episodes run for 30 minutes, and the program aired during the 2000-01 television season. Brian Dennehy hosted.

The program was produced by Dick Wolf, executive producer and creator of the Law & Order franchise.

Steve Zirnkilton, also of the Law & Order franchise was the show's narrator.

The show was transmitted in the UK on Channel 5.

External links

2000 American television series debuts
2001 American television series endings
2000s American legal television series
First-run syndicated television programs in the United States
Law & Order (franchise)
Television series by Universal Television